Events from the year 1999 in the United States.

Incumbents

Federal government 
 President: Bill Clinton (D-Arkansas)
 Vice President: Al Gore (D-Tennessee)
 Chief Justice: William Rehnquist (Wisconsin) 
 Speaker of the House of Representatives: Newt Gingrich (R-Georgia) (until January 3), Dennis Hastert  (R-Illinois) (starting January 6)
 Senate Majority Leader: Trent Lott (R-Mississippi)
 Congress: 105th (until January 3), 106th (starting January 3)

Events

January
 January 1 – DIY Network, a spinoff of Home and Garden Television, is launched.
 January 6 – Dennis Hastert becomes Speaker of the United States House of Representatives.
 January 7 – The Senate trial in the impeachment of President Bill Clinton begins.  He had been impeached by the House of Representatives on December 19.
 January 14–17 – The Winter X Games take place in Crested Butte.
 January 22 – An F3 tornado strikes downtown Clarksville, Tennessee, destroying and heavily damaging more than 500 buildings, including the historic Montgomery County Courthouse, and nationally registered Trinity Episcopal Church and Madison Street United Methodist Church.
 January 31 – The adult animated sitcom Family Guy debuts on the Fox network after Super Bowl XXXIII.

February

 February 1 – The Disney Channel Preschool Block is rebranded as Playhouse Disney.
 February 2 – Noggin is launched.
 February 4 
Unarmed West African immigrant Amadou Diallo is shot dead by four plainclothes New York City police officers on an unrelated stake-out, inflaming race-relations in the city.
The New Carissa runs aground near Coos Bay, Oregon.
 February 12 – Impeachment of Bill Clinton: President Bill Clinton is acquitted by the Senate.
 February 15 – Rapper Big L is shot to death.
 February 19 – President Bill Clinton issues a posthumous pardon for U.S. Army Lt. Henry Ossian Flipper.
 February 23 – White supremacist John William King is found guilty of kidnapping and murdering African American James Byrd Jr. by dragging him behind a truck for 2 miles (3 km).
 February 24 – LaGrand case: The state of Arizona executes Karl LaGrand, a German national involved in an armed robbery that led to a death. Karl's brother Walter is executed a week later, in spite of Germany's legal action in the International Court of Justice to attempt to save him.

March
 March 2 – The new Mandalay Bay hotel and casino opens on the Las Vegas Strip.
 March 3 – Walter LaGrand is executed in the gas chamber in Arizona.
 March 4 – In a military court, United States Marine Corps Captain Richard J. Ashby is acquitted of the charge of reckless flying which resulted in the deaths of 20 skiers in the Italian Alps, when his low-flying jet hit a gondola cable.
 March 8 – The Supreme Court of the United States upholds the murder convictions of Timothy McVeigh for the Oklahoma City bombing.
 March 11 – Infosys becomes the first Indian company listed on the NASDAQ stock exchange.
 March 17 – The Roth IRA is introduced by U.S. Senator William V. Roth Jr.
 March 20 – Legoland California, the only Legoland outside of Europe, opens in Carlsbad, California.
 March 21 – The 71st Academy Awards, hosted by Whoopi Goldberg, are held at Dorothy Chandler Pavilion in Los Angeles, with John Madden's Shakespeare in Love winning seven awards out of 13 nominations, including Best Picture. Steven Spielberg wins his second Best Director award for Saving Private Ryan. The telecast garners over 45.5 million viewers.
 March 25 – Enron energy traders allegedly route 2,900 megawatts of electricity destined for California to the town of Silver Peak, Nevada, population 200.
 March 26 – A Michigan jury finds Dr. Jack Kevorkian guilty of second-degree murder for administering a lethal injection to a terminally ill man.
 March 27 – Kosovo War: A U.S. F-117 Nighthawk is shot down by Serbian forces.
 March 28 – Futurama debuts on Fox.
 March 29 – For the first time, the Dow Jones Industrial Average closes above the 10,000 mark, at 10,006.78.
 March 31 – The Matrix is released in theaters.

April

 April 1 – Air China Flight 9018, a Boeing 747, taxis onto an active runway at O'Hare International Airport during the takeoff of Korean Air Flight 36, another Boeing 747, nearly resulting in a crash. Flight 36 averted a collision by taking off early and missing the Air China aircraft by 75 feet. There were 8 people on the Air China cargo plane and 379 on the Korean Air flight.
 April 5 – In Laramie, Wyoming, Russell Henderson pleads guilty to kidnapping and felony murder, in order to avoid a possible death penalty conviction for the killing of Matthew Shepard.
 April 7 – The World Trade Organization rules in favor of the United States in its long-running trade dispute with the European Union over bananas. 
 April 8 – Bill Gates' personal fortune exceeds US$100 billion, thanks to the increased value of Microsoft stock.
 April 12 – U.S. President Bill Clinton is cited for contempt of court for giving "intentionally false statements" in a sexual harassment civil lawsuit.
 April 15 – Ron Williamson and Dennis Fritz are exonerated of the rape and murder of Debbie Carter and released from prison. Both had spent 11 years in prison, with Williamson on death row, and having come within five days of execution.
 April 20 – Columbine High School massacre: Two Littleton, Colorado teenagers, Eric Harris and Dylan Klebold, open fire on their teachers and classmates, killing 12 students and one teacher, and then themselves. It would be the deadliest shooting at a high school in U.S. history at the time. The shooting sparks debate on school bullying, gun control and violence in the media.

May

 May 1
The animated children's TV series SpongeBob SquarePants debuts on the cable network Nickelodeon.
The body of English mountaineer George Mallory is discovered on Mount Everest during a summit journey. 
 May 3 
Norman J. Sirnic and Karen Sirnic are murdered by serial killer Angel Maturino Resendiz in Weimar, Texas.
The Dow Jones Industrial Average closes above 11,000 for the first time, at 11,014.70.
 May 3–6 – 1999 Oklahoma tornado outbreak spawns 140 tornadoes, including an F5 in Moore, Oklahoma that kills 38 people with the highest wind speeds ever recorded.
 May 5 – Microsoft releases Windows 98 (Second Edition).
 May 8 – Nancy Mace becomes the first female cadet to graduate from The Military College of South Carolina.
 May 19 – Star Wars: Episode I – The Phantom Menace is released in theaters. It becomes the highest grossing Star Wars film.
 May 20 – American daredevil Robbie Knievel jumps  over the Grand Canyon on a 500cc motorcycle.
 May 25 – The United States House of Representatives releases the Cox Report which details the People's Republic of China's nuclear espionage against the U.S. over the prior two decades.
 May 29 – Space Shuttle Discovery completes the first docking with the International Space Station.
 May 31 – Sean Elliott of the San Antonio Spurs hits the Memorial Day Miracle against the Portland Trail Blazers in the 1999 NBA Playoffs.

June
 June 1 – American Airlines Flight 1420 overruns the runway in Little Rock, Arkansas, killing 11 people.
 June 8 – The government of Colombia announces it will include the estimated value of the country's illegal drug crops, exceeding half a billion US dollars, in its gross national product.
 June 12 – Texas Governor George W. Bush announces he will seek the Republican Party nomination for President of the United States.
 June 18 – Walt Disney Pictures' 37th feature film, Tarzan, is released to critical praise and box office success. It is the final film to be released during the Disney Renaissance era, which began ten years prior with 1989's The Little Mermaid.
 June 19 – Horror author Stephen King is hit in a car accident on Route 5 in North Lovell, Maine by Bryan Smith.
 June 23 – The Phillips explosion of 1999 kills two and injures three in Pasadena, Texas.

July
 July 2
 Benjamin Nathaniel Smith begins a three-day killing spree targeting racial and ethnic minorities in Illinois and Indiana, which ends in Smith's suicide.
 Lawrence Summers is sworn in as the new Secretary of Treasury, succeeding Robert Rubin.
 July 5 – July 6 – U.S. Army Pfc. Barry Winchell is bludgeoned in his sleep at Fort Campbell, Kentucky by fellow soldiers; he dies the next day from his injuries.
 July 8 – A major flash flood in Las Vegas swamps hundreds of cars, smashes mobile homes and kills two people.
July 10 – U.S. soccer player Brandi Chastain scores the game winning penalty kick against China in the FIFA Women's World Cup.
July 14 – Big Blue Crane collapses while constructing Miller Park killing three workers.
 July 16 – Off the coast of Martha's Vineyard, a plane piloted by John F. Kennedy Jr. crashes, killing him and his wife, Carolyn Bessette Kennedy, and her sister, Lauren Bessette.
 July 20 – Mercury program: Liberty Bell 7 is raised from the Atlantic Ocean.
 July 22 – The first version of MSN Messenger is released by Microsoft.
 July 23–25 – The Woodstock '99 festival is held in New York.
 July 25 – Lance Armstrong wins his first Tour de France.
 July 26 – The last Checker taxi cab is retired in New York City and auctioned off for approximately $135,000.
 July 29
1999 Atlanta day trading firm shootings: Mark Orrin Barton kills his family. He then goes on a murder spree at the trading firm he worked at, killing a total of 12 people in Atlanta, Georgia. He later committed suicide at a gas station when cornered by police.
NASA intentionally crashes the Lunar Prospector spacecraft into the Moon, thus ending its mission to detect frozen water on the lunar surface.

August
 August 10 – Buford O. Furrow Jr. wounds five and kills one during the Los Angeles Jewish Community Center shooting.

September
 September 6 – A big day for children's television: On PBS, PTV is completely re-branded as PBS Kids with new IDs, bumpers, and promos, whilst on UPN, a new weekly block called Disney's One Too debuts, a spinoff of ABC's Disney's One Saturday Morning.
 September 7 – Viacom and CBS merge.
 September 9 – The Sega Company introduces in American market the new game console with the name Dreamcast.
 September 15 – Larry Gene Ashbrook murders seven people and then commits suicide at Wedgwood Baptist Church in Fort Worth, Texas.
 September 23 – NASA announces that it has lost contact with the Mars Climate Orbiter.
 September 27 – The Detroit Tigers host the Kansas City Royals in the final game at Tiger Stadium

October
 October 9 – The last flight of the SR-71.
 October 13 – The United States Senate rejects ratification of the Comprehensive Nuclear-Test-Ban Treaty (CTBT).
 October 16 – The 7.1  Hector Mine earthquake shook the Mojave Desert region of Southern California with a maximum Mercalli intensity of VII (Very strong), causing 4–5 injuries and limited damage.
 October 27 – The New York Yankees sweep the Atlanta Braves to win their 25th world championship.
 October 31 – EgyptAir Flight 990, traveling from New York City to Cairo, crashes off the coast of Nantucket, Massachusetts, killing all 217 on board. The NTSB later reports that the co-pilot, Gameel Al-Batouti, deliberately crashed the plane, however, Egyptian authorities dispute this claim.

November

 November 2 – Byran Uyesugi kills seven people at a Xerox building in Honolulu, Hawaii.
 November 18 – The Aggie Bonfire collapses in College Station, Texas, killing 12.
 November 24 – Disney/Pixar's third feature film, Toy Story 2, the sequel to 1995's Toy Story, is released in theaters.
 November 28 – Little Bill debuts on Nickelodeon.
 November 30
 In Seattle, Washington, protests against the WTO meeting by anti-globalization protesters catch police unprepared and force the cancellation of opening ceremonies.
 The ExxonMobil merger is completed, forming the largest corporation in the world at that time.

December
 December – The unemployment rate drops to 4%, the lowest level since January 1970.
 December 3 – NASA loses radio contact with the Mars Polar Lander, moments before the spacecraft enters the Martian atmosphere.
 December 7 – The Recording Industry Association of America files a lawsuit against the Napster file-sharing client, alleging copyright infringement.
 December 16 – Walt Disney Pictures' 38th feature film, Fantasia 2000, a sequel to 1940's Fantasia, premieres at Carnegie Hall, with an IMAX release on New Years Day 2000 and a general theatrical release later in June.
 December 18 – NASA launches into orbit the Terra platform, carrying 5 Earth Observation instruments, including ASTER, CERES, MISR, MODIS and MOPITT.
 December 31 – The U.S. turns over complete administration of the Panama Canal to the Panamanian government, as stipulated in the Torrijos–Carter Treaties of 1977.

Ongoing
 Iraqi no-fly zones (1991–2003)
 Dot-com bubble (c. 1995–c. 2000)
 Lewinsky scandal (1998–1999)

Undated
Marathon Capital, an independent investment bank is founded.
Nora Ross is inducted into the Trapshooting Hall of Fame.
Orderzone.com, an online business-to-business website, is launched.
Resperion, a road construction products company is founded.

Births

January 

 January 1 – Diamond White, singer and actress
 January 5
 Miguel Morales, rapper
 Marc Yu, musician
January 6 – Polo G , American rapper
 January 13 – Nicholas Art, actor
 January 14 – Zach Hsieh, youtuber
 January 18
 Karan Brar, actor
 Tee Higgins, American football player
 Mateus Ward, actor
 January 19 – Jonathan Taylor, American football player
 January 20 – Shannon Tavarez, actress (d. 2010)
 January 21 – Em Beihold, singer and songwriter
 January 22 – Ravyn Lenae, singer
 January 23 – Madi Davis, singer
 January 28
 Dobre Twins, youtubers
 Preston Strother, actor

February 

 February 1 – Lola Forsberg, actress
 February 7 – Bea Miller, singer-songwriter and actress
 February 10 – Tiffany Espensen, Chinese-born actress
 February 11 – Candace Hill, athlete
 February 14 – Tyler Adams, soccer player
 February 18 – Lorraine McNamara, ice dancer
 February 19 
 Joseph Ryan Harrington, actor and dancer
 Jackson Pace, actor

March 

 March 2 – Caleb Lee Hutchinson, singer
 March 5
Justin Fields, American football player
 Madison Beer, singer
 Colin Schooler, American football player
 March 16 – Bailie Key, artistic gymnast
 March 19 – Gabby Petito, murder victim
 March 22 – Gavin MacIntosh, actor
March 23 – Quando Rondo, rapper
March 25
Iann Dior, rapper
Mikey Madison, actress
 March 26
 Scarlett Stitt, actress
 Quinn Sullivan, songwriter and musician
 March 31 – Sawyer Fredericks, singer-songwriter

April 

 April 2 – Sophie Reynolds, actress
 April 6 – Kwesi Boakye, actor
 April 8 – Ty Panitz, actor
 April 9 – Lil Nas X, rapper, singer and songwriter
 April 20 – Carly Rose Sonenclar, actress, singer and songwriter
 April 23 – Claud, singer-songwriter
 April 29 – Morgan Turner, actress

May 

 May 1 – YNW Melly, American rapper
 May 3 – Rory Staunton, notable victim (d. 2012)
 May 4 – Tyler Senerchia, professional wrestler
 May 5
 Nathan Chen, figure skater
 Bobby Coleman, actor
 May 10 – Michael Gandolfini, actor
 May 11
 Sabrina Carpenter, actress
 Madison Lintz, actress
 May 18 – Teo Halm, actor
 May 22 – Camren Bicondova, actress
 May 23
 Trinidad Cardona, musician
 James Charles, makeup artist
 May 24
 Charlie Plummer, actor
 Ali Kabbani, gamer better known as Myth
 May 25 – Brec Bassinger, actress
 May 27 – Lily-Rose Depp, actress and model
 May 28 – Cameron Boyce, actor (d. 2019)
 May 30 – Sean Giambrone, actor and voice actor
 May 31 – Emily Evan Rae, actress

June 

 June 1 – Technoblade, internet personality (d. 2022)
 June 2 – Madison Leisle, actress
 June 9 – Zane Smith, stock car racing driver
 June 11
 Katelyn Nacon, actress
 Saxon Sharbino, actress
 June 13 – Alexis Roland, snowboarder
 June 17 – Frances Forever, singer-songwriter
 June 18
 Trippie Redd, rapper
 Willie Spence, singer (d. 2022)
 June 20 – Kayla Maisonet, actress
 June 22 – Cam Akers, American football player
 June 26 – Harley Quinn Smith, actress
 June 27 – Chandler Riggs, actor

July 
 July 14 – Camryn Magness, singer
 July 20 – Pop Smoke, rapper
 July 28
 GloRilla, rapper
 Troy Brown Jr., basketball player
 July 30 – Joey King, actress

August 

 August 4 – Kelly Gould, actress
 August 9 – Ariana Guido, actress
 August 12 – Dream, MinecraftMinecraft-themed YouTuber
 August 13 – Eli Brown, actor
 August 14
 Bryce Hall, social media influencer
 Alison Thornton, actress
 August 16 – Karen Chen, figure skater
 August 19
 Ethan Cutkosky, actor
 Salem Ilese, musician
 Tristan Lake Leabu, actor
 August 21 – Maxim Knight, actor
 August 22 – Ricardo Hurtado, actor and singer
 August 25 – Sophie Cates, singer-songwriter

September 

 September 1 – Jadagrace, actress, singer, and dancer
 September 2 – Gavin Casalegno, actor
 September 7
 Gracie Abrams, singer-songwriter
 Cameron Ocasio, actor
 September 14 
 Emma Kenney, actress
 Tom Schaar, skateboarder
 September 15 – Jaren Jackson Jr., basketball player
 September 21 – Brennan LaBrie, journalist
 September 22 – Tallan Latz, guitarist
 September 28 – Kayla Day, tennis player

October 

 October 3 – Aramis Knight, actor
 October 14 – Laura Zeng, rhythmic gymnast
 October 15 – Bailee Madison, actress
 October 20 – NBA YoungBoy, rapper
 October 22 – Sub Urban, musician

November 
 November 1 – Buddy Handleson, actor
 November 8 – Pooh Shiesty, rapper
 November 10
 Michael Cimino, actor
 Kiernan Shipka, actress
 November 11 – Samara Joy, singer
 November 13 – 24kGoldn, rapper
 November 23 – Nikki Castillo, voice actress
 November 29 – River Alexander, actor

December 

 December 2 
 Samuel Armas, notable fetal patient
 Fred Hechinger, actor
 December 6 – Ryan Wynott, actor
 December 16 – Dolan Twins, youtube comedians
 December 18 – YBN Nahmir, rapper and songwriter

Full date unknown 
 Lex, notable canine (d. 2012)

Deaths

January 

 January 4 – Iron Eyes Cody, Italian-American actor (b. 1904)
 January 12 – Betty Lou Gerson, American actress (b. 1914)
 January 18 – Sarah Louise Delany, American author and educator (b. 1889)
 January 21 – Susan Strasberg, American actress (b. 1938)
 January 23 – John Osteen, American televangelist (b. 1921)
 January 25 – Robert Shaw, American conductor (b. 1916)
 January 31 – Norm Zauchin, American baseball player (b. 1929)

February 

 February 1 – Paul Mellon, American philanthropist (b. 1907)
 February 6 – Jimmy Roberts, American singer (b. 1924)
 February 7 – Bobby Troup, American actor, jazz pianist, singer and songwriter (b. 1918)
 February 14
 Buddy Knox, American singer and songwriter (b. 1933)
 John Ehrlichman, American Watergate scandal figure (b. 1925)
 February 15
 Big L, American rapper (b. 1974)
 Henry Way Kendall, American physicist (b. 1926)
 February 18
 Andreas Feininger, French-born American photographer (b. 1906)
 Noam Pitlik, American actor and director (b. 1932)
 February 20 – Gene Siskel, American film critic (b. 1946)
 February 21 – Gertrude B. Elion, American scientist (b. 1918)
 February 22 – William Bronk, American poet (b. 1918)
 February 24
 Andre Dubus, American short-story writer (b. 1936)
 Virginia Foster Durr, American civil rights activist (b. 1903)
 February 25 – Glenn T. Seaborg, American chemist (b. 1912)
 February 28 – Bill Talbert, American tennis player (b. 1918)

March 

 March 1 – Ann Corio, American dancer and actress (b. 1909)
 March 3 – Jackson C. Frank, American folk musician (b. 1943)
 March 4
 Harry Blackmun, American judge (b. 1908)
 Del Close, American actor, writer, and teacher (b. 1934)
 March 5 – Richard Kiley, American actor (b. 1922)
 March 7
 Sidney Gottlieb, American intelligence official (b. 1918)
 Stanley Kubrick, American film director, and producer, died in Harpenden, Hertfordshire, United Kingdom (b. 1928)
 March 8
 Peggy Cass, American actress and comedian (b. 1924)
 Joe DiMaggio, American baseball player, advertising spokesman (b. 1914)
 March 12 – Yehudi Menuhin, American violinist (b. 1916)
 March 13
 Lee Falk, American writer, theater director, and producer (b. 1911)
 Garson Kanin, American playwright and screenwriter (b. 1912)
 March 22 – David Strickland, American actor (b. 1969)
 March 26 – David Holliday, American actor (b. 1937)
 March 29 – Joe Williams, American singer (b. 1918)
 March 30 – Terry Wilson, American actor (b. 1923)

April 

 April 4
 Faith Domergue, American actress (b. 1924)
 Early Wynn, American baseball player (b. 1920)
 April 10 – Jean Vander Pyl, American television actress (b. 1919)
 April 12 – Boxcar Willie, American country music singer (b. 1931)
 April 14 – Ellen Corby, American actress (b. 1911)
 April 15 – Roy Chiao, Chinese actor (b. 1927)
 April 20
 Cassie Bernall, American student (b. 1981)
 Eric Harris, American mass murderer (b. 1981)
 Dylan Klebold, American mass murderer (b. 1981)
 Rick Rude, American professional wrestler (b. 1958)
 Rachel Scott, American student (b. 1981)
 April 21 – Charles "Buddy" Rogers, American silent film actor (b. 1904)
 April 22 – Bert Remsen, American actor (b. 1925)
 April 25
 Herman Miller, American screenwriter and producer (b. 1919)
 Roger Troutman, American funk musician (b. 1951)
 April 27 – Al Hirt, American trumpeter and bandleader (b. 1922)
 April 28
 Rory Calhoun, American television and film actor (b. 1922)
 Arthur Leonard Schawlow, American physicist (b. 1921)

May 
 May 8 – Dana Plato, American actress (b. 1964)
 May 10 – Shel Silverstein, American poet, singer-songwriter, cartoonist, screenwriter, and author of children's books (b. 1930)
 May 13 – Gene Sarazen, American golfer (b. 1902)
 May 17 – Henry Jones, American actor (b. 1912)
 May 18 – Betty Robinson, American athlete (b. 1911)
 May 19 – Candy Candido, American voice actor (b. 1913)
 May 23 – John T. Hayward, American admiral (b. 1908)
 May 26 – Waldo Semon, American inventor (b. 1898)

June 

 June 3 – Charlene Pryer, American professional baseball player (b. 1921)
 June 5 – Mel Tormé, American singer (b. 1925)
 June 9 – Andrew L. Stone, American screenwriter, director and producer (b. 1902)
 June 11 – DeForest Kelley, American actor (b. 1920)
 June 19 – Paul Montgomery, American entrepreneur and inventor (b. 1960)
 June 25 – Fred Trump, American real estate developer, father of Donald Trump (b. 1905)
 June 27
 Isaac C. Kidd, Jr., American admiral (b. 1919)
 Marion Motley, American football player (b. 1920)
 June 29 – Allan Carr, American producer (b. 1937)

July 

 July 1
 Edward Dmytryk, Canadian-American film director (b. 1908)
 Guy Mitchell, American singer (b. 1927)
 Sylvia Sidney, American actress (b. 1910)
 July 2 – Mario Puzo, American author (b. 1920)
 July 3 – Mark Sandman, American rock musician and artist (b. 1952)
 July 6 
Carl Gunter Jr., American farmer and politician (b. 1938)
Gary M. Heidnik, American killer, kidnapper, and rapist (b. 1943)
 July 7 – Julie Campbell Tatham, American writer (b. 1908)
 July 8 – Pete Conrad, American astronaut, naval aviator, and aeronautical engineer (b. 1930)
 July 9 – James Farmer, American civil rights leader (b. 1920)
 July 11 – Helen Forrest, American jazz singer (b. 1917)
 July 16
 John F. Kennedy Jr., American journalist and lawyer (b. 1960)
 Carolyn Bessette-Kennedy, American actress and model (b. 1966)
 July 20 – Sandra Gould, American actress (b. 1916)
 July 22 – Gar Samuelson, American drummer (b. 1958)
 July 29 – Anita Carter, American singer (b. 1933)

August 

 August 2 – Willie Morris, American writer (b. 1934)
 August 3
 Marion O. McKinney Jr., aerospace scientist (b. 1921)
 Leroy Vinnegar, American musician (b. 1928)
 August 4 – Victor Mature, American actor (b. 1913)
 August 10 – Anthony Stanislas Radziwill, American television executive and filmmaker (b. 1959)
 August 14
 Lane Kirkland, American union leader (b. 1922)
 Pee Wee Reese, American baseball player (b. 1918)
 August 23 – Norman Wexler, American screenwriter (b. 1926)
 August 24 – Mary Jane Croft, American radio and television actress (b. 1916)

September 

 September 5 – Allen Funt, American television personality (b. 1914)
 September 7 – Jim Keith, American author (b. 1949)
 September 8 – Moondog, American musician and composer (b. 1916)
 September 9
 Catfish Hunter, American baseball player (b. 1946)
 Ruth Roman, American actress (b. 1922)
 September 12 – Allen Stack, American swimmer (b. 1928)
 September 22 – George C. Scott, American actor (b. 1927)
 September 25 – Marion Zimmer Bradley, American writer (b. 1930)

October 

 October 2
 Lee Lozano, American artist (b. 1930)
 Danny Mayo, American songwriter (b. 1950)
 October 3 – Paul Burris, American baseball player (b. 1923)
 October 4 – Art Farmer, American jazz trumpeter (b. 1928)
 October 5 – Alex Lowe, American mountaineer (b. 1958)
 October 6 – Gorilla Monsoon, American professional wrestler and announcer (b. 1937)
 October 7
 David A. Huffman, American computer scientist (b. 1925)
 Helen Vinson, American actress (b. 1907)
 October 8 – John McLendon, American basketball coach (b. 1915)
 October 9 – Milt Jackson, American musician (b. 1923)
 October 10 – George Forrest, American writer (b. 1915)
 October 12 – Wilt Chamberlain, American basketball player (b. 1936)
 October 19 – James C. Murray, American politician (b. 1917)
 October 24 – John Chafee, American politician (b. 1922)
 October 25 – Payne Stewart, American golfer (b. 1957)
 October 26 – Abraham Polonsky, American screenwriter and director (b. 1910)
 October 27
 Frank De Vol, American arranger, composer, and actor (b. 1911)
 Robert Mills, American physicist (b. 1927)

November 

 November 1
 Theodore Hall, American physicist and spy (b. 1925)
 Walter Payton, American football player (b. 1954)
 November 4 – Daisy Bates, American civil rights activist, publisher, journalist, and lecturer (b. 1914)
 November 9 – Mabel King, American actress and singer (b. 1932)
 November 11 – Mary Kay Bergman, American voice actress (b. 1961)
 November 15 – Gene Levitt, American television writer, producer, and director (b. 1920)
 November 16 – Daniel Nathans, American microbiologist, recipient of the Nobel Prize in Physiology or Medicine (b. 1928)
 November 18
 Paul Bowles, American novelist (b. 1910)
 Horst P. Horst, American photographer (b. 1906)
 Doug Sahm, American musician (b. 1941)
 November 29 – Gene Rayburn, American television personality (b. 1917)

December 

 December 2
 Joey Adams, American comedian (b. 1911)
 Charlie Byrd, American jazz musician and classical guitarist (b. 1925)
 December 3
 John Archer, American actor (b. 1915)
 Scatman John, American musician, singer, and songwriter (b. 1942)
 Madeline Kahn, American actress and singer (b. 1942)
 December 4 – Rose Bird, American activist and judge (b. 1936)
 December 12
 Paul Cadmus, American artist (b. 1904)
 Joseph Heller, American novelist (b. 1923)
 December 17
 Rex Allen, American actor, singer, and songwriter (b. 1920)
 Grover Washington, Jr., American saxophonist (b. 1943)
 December 20
 Irving Rapper, American film director (b. 1898)
 Hank Snow, Canadian-American country musician (b. 1914)
 December 23 – John P. Davies, American diplomat (b. 1908)
 December 26 – Curtis Mayfield, American musician and composer (b. 1942)
 December 27 – Leonard Goldenson, American television executive (b. 1905)
 December 28 – Clayton Moore, American actor (b. 1914)
 December 30 – Sarah Knauss, American supercentenarian, verified oldest person in the world (b. 1880)
 December 31 – Elliot Richardson, American politician and lawyer (b. 1920)

See also 
 1999 in American soccer
 1999 in American television
 List of American films of 1999
 Timeline of United States history (1990–2009)

References

External links
 

 
1990s in the United States
United States
United States
Years of the 20th century in the United States